The Theodore Roosevelt Lake Bridge is a vehicular bridge traversing Theodore Roosevelt Lake between Gila County and Maricopa County, Arizona. Prior to its completion, traffic on Arizona SR 188 traveled directly on top of the Theodore Roosevelt Lake Dam. The bridge's completion helped relieve traffic off of the dam; it was originally designed to accommodate the width of two Ford Model-T automobiles, but increasing vehicle widths meant that the dam could only support one-way traffic at the time the bridge opened.  

Per the United States Bureau of Reclamation, in 1995, along with other notable bridges such as the Brooklyn Bridge and Golden Gate Bridge, the bridge was listed by the American Consulting Engineers Council as one of top twelve bridges designs in the United States, and is currently the "longest two-lane, single-span, steel-arch bridge in North America". The build contract was awarded to Edward Kraemer & Sons, Inc. of Plain, Wisconsin, with an overall total cost of $21.3 million USD in 1992. It was initially painted sky blue, but has since turned white.

References 

Bridges completed in 1992
Landmarks in Arizona
Road bridges in Arizona
Tied arch bridges in the United States
1992 establishments in Arizona
Buildings and structures in Gila County, Arizona
Transportation buildings and structures in Maricopa County, Arizona